Murray Graham Chandler  (born 4 April 1960, Wellington, New Zealand) is a chess grandmaster who has played internationally for New Zealand and for England, after he gained British citizenship in the early 1980s. Chandler is also known as a chess writer and occasional organiser of chess tournaments. He is also the only NZ chess over-the-board grandmaster.

Career

Chandler won the New Zealand chess championship in 1975–76, and qualified as an International Master in 1977 by winning the first Asian Junior Chess Championship in Baguio. His first international chess appearance was in 1974 when he turned out for the New Zealand team in the first Asian Team Chess Championship in Penang, Malaysia. Later, he represented New Zealand at the Chess Olympiads of 1976, 1978 and 1980 but then switched allegiance to England. He played for England at the Chess Olympiads of 1982, 1984, 1986, 1988, 1990 and 1992, as part of a highly successful team that defeated the Soviets in some crucial encounters. He qualified for the grandmaster title in 1983, and maintained an Elo rating around the 2600 level between 1987 and 1992.

Amongst Chandler's best results have been Commonwealth Champion (twice – jointly in 1984 and outright in 1987), first place at Brighton 1981, first place in the Blackpool Zonal of 1990, tie for first place, Lloyds Bank Masters 1979, tie for first place, Hastings Premier 1986/7, and tied for second place (behind Anatoly Karpov), London 1984. He also played for the Rest of World team versus the Soviet Union in 1984 and tied first at the British Chess Championship of 1986, but lost the play-off match for the title.

One curiosity is his lifetime score of two wins, no draws, no losses against Garry Kasparov. One win was in the World Under-16 Championship in 1976, and the other in a simultaneous display in 1985.

Chandler was editor of British Chess Magazine from 1991 to 1999. In the late 1990s he also set up Gambit Publications, a publisher of high quality chess books that has received good reviews from all quarters. Fellow Gambit directors were England teammate John Nunn and FIDE Master-cum-author, Graham Burgess. The company now has a large back-catalogue containing contributions from all three directors and from a host of other respected chess writers. Books like Modern Chess Strategy by John L. Watson have been highly acclaimed and Chandler's own How To Beat Your Dad At Chess is a very large seller. He also produced VHS and DVD material for Bad Bishop Ltd., a company related to Gambit, including a repertoire against the Nc6 Sicilian, based on the early Bb5 lines.

He returned to New Zealand in 2006, winning his second New Zealand Chess Championship that year and a third champion's title in 2008. He has now reverted his player registration to the New Zealand Federation, making him eligible once more to play for his country of birth.

In 2013, he purchased the old Saint Paul's church in Auckland, converting it into a chess coaching centre.

In the 2017 New Year Honours Chandler was appointed a Member of the New Zealand Order of Merit for services to chess.

Notable games

Chandler's 23.e6 is difficult to find, as it appears that the square is defended four ways. None of the available captures are satisfactory, however, making it equally difficult to meet.

Chandler vs. Helgi Ólafsson, Hastings 1990/1991; Ruy Lopez, Worrall Attack 1.e4 e5 2.Nf3 Nc6 3.Bb5 a6 4.Ba4 Nf6 5.0-0 Be7 6.Qe2 b5 7.Bb3 0-0 8.c3 d6 9.d4 Bg4 10.Rd1 Qc8 11.a4 b4 12.a5 bxc3 13.bxc3 Rb8 14.Bc4 exd4 15.cxd4 Nxa5 16.Rxa5 Rxb1 17.e5 dxe5 18.dxe5 Ne8 19.Rxa6 Rb6 20.Ra4 c5 21.h3 Bh5 22.Ra7 Nc7 23.e6 Bf6 24.e7 Re8 25.Rd8 Rxd8 26.Rxc7 Qb8 27.exd8=Q+ Qxd8 28.Bf4 g5 29.Bg3 Rb2 30.Qd3 Qa8 31.Qd7 Qa1+ 32.Kh2 Rb1 33.Bxf7+ Kh8 34.Qe8+ Kg7 35.Bg6+

Selected bibliography
The Complete c3 Sicilian, 1997, American Batsford, .
How To Beat Your Dad At Chess, 1998, Gambit Publications, .
Chess Tactics For Kids, 2003, Gambit Publications, .
Chess For Children (with Helen Milligan), 2004, Gambit Publications, .

Notes

References
Whyld, Kenneth, Guinness Chess The Records, Guinness Books, 1986.
Auckland Chess website

External links
Murray Chandler comprehensive games and results collection at britbase.info

Books by Murray Chandler

Chess grandmasters
Chess Olympiad competitors
Chandler Murray
Chandler Murray
1960 births
Living people
British writers
Chess writers
Members of the New Zealand Order of Merit